Clearly Love is the sixth studio album by Olivia Newton-John, released in September 1975.

Commercial performance
The album was certified gold in the US. and both of the album's singles were country chart hits, with "Something Better to Do" reaching number 19 and "Let It Shine" (written by Nashville songwriter Linda Hargrove) reaching 5. Clearly Love also did well in Japan, reaching number 3 on the Oricon Albums Chart and selling 110,450 copies there.

Singles
The 1940s retro sounding "Something Better to Do" and the country "Let it Shine" (backed with her version of "He Ain't Heavy, He's My Brother") were the two single releases. This song became popular on country music stations, hitting the top 10 on the Country chart. Both singles were number 1 Adult Contemporary chart hits in the United States, but performed comparatively poorly on the Billboard Hot 100 at numbers 13 and 30 respectively, the beginning of a decline at Newton-John's popularity at Top 40 radio in the US that would not be reversed until her starring role in the movie musical Grease in 1978.

Track listing

Personnel 
 Olivia Newton-John – lead vocals 
 Graham Todd – keyboards; arrangement on "Slow Down Jackson"
 Terry Britten – acoustic guitar 
 John Farrar – acoustic guitar, electric guitar, backing vocals, arrangements
 B.J. Cole – steel guitar
 Keith Nelson – 5-string banjo
 Alan Tarney – bass
 Dave Olney - bass on "Summertime Blues"
 Mike Sammes - bass vocal on "Summertime Blues"
 Brian Bennett – drums 
 Vicki Brown – backing vocals 
 Pat Farrar – backing vocals 
 Margo Newman – backing vocals 
 Clare Torry – backing vocals
 John Fiddy - orchestration on "Slow Down Jackson"

Production 
 John Farrar – producer 
 Tony Clark – engineer 
 Allan Rouse – engineer
 Michael Stavroes – mixing 
 Brian Ingoldsby – mastering 
 George Osaki – art direction, design 
 Charles William Bush – photography 
 Larry Marmorstein – graphics

Studios 
 Recorded at Abbey Road Studios (London, UK).
 Mixed at AIR Studios (London, UK).
 Mastered at MCA Recording Studios (North Hollywood, California, USA).

Charts

Weekly charts

Year-end charts

Certifications and sales

References

1975 albums
Olivia Newton-John albums
Albums produced by John Farrar
MCA Records albums